Posoco (possibly from Quechua for foam) is a mountain in the Chila mountain range in the Andes of Peru, about  high. It is situated in the Arequipa Region, Castilla Province, on the border of the districts of Chachas and Choco.

Posoco is also the name of an intermittent stream which originates at the mountain. It flows to Collpamayo (possibly from Quechua for "salty river") in the southeast. Collpamayo is a tributary of Molloco River which is a right affluent of Colca River.

References

Mountains of Peru
Mountains of Arequipa Region